Patrick Bühlmann (born 16 August 1971) is a retired Swiss football midfielder.

References

1970 births
Living people
Swiss men's footballers
FC Luzern players
FC Aarau players
FC Sion players
FC St. Gallen players
Servette FC players
FC Lausanne-Sport players
FC Zürich players
SC Kriens players
SC Cham players
Switzerland international footballers
Association football midfielders